The Saxony duck is a German breed of domestic duck. It was bred in Saxony in the 1930s, but because of the Second World War was recognised only in 1957.

History 

Almost all of the original stock was lost during World War II. After the War, Franz started breeding again from the remaining stock.

The Saxony was officially recognised in East Germany in 1957, in West Germany in 1958. Birds were taken to Switzerland in 1965 and to France in 1968. The Saxony was recognised in the United Kingdom in 1982. Some were imported to the United States by David Holderread in 1984; the Saxony was admitted to the Standard of Perfection of the American Poultry Association in 2000.

In 2013 the total number in Germany was 1173. In North America, the breed is listed as "threatened" by the American Livestock Breeds Conservancy.

Characteristics 

Physically, the Saxony resembles the Silver Appleyard. The head is oval-shaped and is moderately large. The Saxony has a deep, full breast with plenty of width that is carried across the back of the bird and extends towards the tail. The abdomen is broad and full, free of keel development as seen in exhibition-type Rouen ducks. The body is held at about 25° to the horizontal.

The Saxony has only one colour variety, buff-blue mallard: the drake has a greyish-blue head, white neck-ring, and rust- or chestnut-coloured breast feathers; the duck is a rich, light buff colour with two white stripes on each side of the face, one over the eye and the other from the eye towards the beak. Both drakes and ducks have a yellowish bill and orange legs and feet, although the standard specifies dark yellow.

The Saxony forages well and is straightforward to rear.

Use 

The Saxony is a dual-purpose breed, reared both for its eggs and for the table. Ducks lay approximately 80 or 100 eggs per year. The eggs are white and weigh some

Note

References 

Duck breeds
Duck breeds originating in Germany
Conservation Priority Breeds of the Livestock Conservancy
Culture of Saxony